Nicole Taylor is a Scottish screenwriter.  She won a British Academy of Film and Television Arts for Best Writer for her three-part BBC series Three Girls about the Rochdale grooming scandal.

Early life and education
Taylor was born and raised in Glasgow, where she attended Craigholme School and graduated from the University of Oxford. Growing up, she was a country music fan.

Career
Upon graduating, Taylor wrote for Ashes to Ashes, The C-Word, Indian Summers, and The Hour. In 2017, she received a British Academy of Film and Television Arts for Best Writer for her three-part BBC series Three Girls. Taylor was also named an Edinburgh International Film Festival Screenwriter-in-Residence.

On 22 August 2018, BBC One announced that Taylor would write for an upcoming drama called The Nest.  While writing for The Nest, Taylor used inspiration from her own life and her fondness of country music. She was also introduced to Krysty Wilson-Cairns, an alumna of Craigholme, and they discovered they were inspired by the same teacher during their school years. In the same year, Taylor and Jessie Buckley collaborated on writing several songs for Wild Rose. For her part as a writer, Taylor received the 2019 Feature Film and Writer Film/Television Award at the BAFTA Scotland Awards.

References

External links
 

Living people
Year of birth missing (living people)
21st-century Scottish women writers
21st-century Scottish writers
Writers from Glasgow
BAFTA winners (people)
Scottish screenwriters
21st-century British screenwriters